Odo of Burgundy, in French Eudes de Bourgogne (1230 – 4 August 1266), was the Count of Nevers, Auxerre and Tonnerre and son of Hugh IV, Duke of Burgundy and Yolande of Dreux.

In 1265, Odo became one of the last European barons to lead a crusading force to the Holy Land. Among his fifty knights was Erard of Valery. He defended Acre when Sultan Baybars I harassed it on 1 June 1266 in advance of his besieging Safad. He died at Acre on 7 August 1266 and was buried in the church of Saint Nicholas. He left all his wealth to pay his followers and to endow hospitals and religious institutions. He was described by the Templar of Tyre as a "holy man", and his tomb attracted veneration. Within a year of his death, the poet Rutebeuf wrote a Complainte du comte Eudes de Nevers, a lament for a valiant knight and also for the city that lost its defender.

Burgundy passed to Odo's brother, Robert.

Marriage and children
Odo married Maud of Dampierre and they had:
Yolande, Countess of Nevers (1247–1280), married (1) John Tristan, Count of Valois, and (2) Count Robert III of Flanders
Margaret, Countess of Tonnerre (1250–1308), married King Charles I of Naples
Adelaide, Countess of Auxerre (1251–1290), married John I of Chalon, Lord of Rochefort
Joan (1253–1271), died young

References

Sources

See also
Dukes of Burgundy family tree

Counts of Nevers
Counts of Auxerre
House of Burgundy
Burgundy, Eudes of
Burgundy, Eudes of
Jure uxoris officeholders